The 1987 Madrid Tennis Grand Prix was a men's tennis tournament played on outdoor clay courts in Madrid, Spain that was part of the 1987 Nabisco Grand Prix circuit. It was the 16th edition of the tournament and was played from 14 September until 20 September 1987. First-seeded Emilio Sánchez won the singles title after defeating his brother Javier in the final.

Finals

Singles
 Emilio Sánchez defeated  Javier Sánchez 6–3, 3–6, 6–2
 It was Sánchez' 4th singles title and the 7th of his career.

Doubles
 Carlos di Laura /  Javier Sánchez defeated  Sergio Casal /  Emilio Sánchez 6–3, 3–6, 7–6

References

External links
 ITF tournament edition details

Madrid Tennis Grand Prix
Madrid
Madrid